The 13319 / 20 Dumka - Ranchi Junction Intercity Express is a Intercity express train belonging to Indian Railways East Central Railway zone that runs between  and  in India.

Coaches
The 13319 / 20 Baidyanathdham Deoghar - Ranchi Junction Intercity Express has 10 general unreserved & two SLR (seating with luggage rake) coaches. It does not carry a pantry car coach.

As with most train services in India, coach composition may be amended at the discretion of Indian Railways depending on demand.

Service

Routing

Traction
As the route is going to electrification, a  based WAP-4 electric locomotive pulls the train up to  later a  based WDM-3A locomotive pulls the train to its destination.

References

External links
13319 Intercity Express at India Rail Info
13320 Intercity Express at India Rail Info

Intercity Express (Indian Railways) trains
Rail transport in Jharkhand
Transport in Ranchi
Transport in Deoghar